Ayaka Shiomura is a Japanese politician who is a member of the House of Councillors of Japan.

Biography 
She was born on July 6, 1978 in Hiroshima Prefecture and attended Kyoritsu Women's Junior College, graduating in 1999. She had studyed abroad in Australia. During her career, she worked as a freelance writer for multiple TV and radio information programs before her 2013 election to the Tokyo Metropolitan Assembly. In 2014, during a debate about childrearing, she was heckled by an unnamed member. In 2019, she was elected to the House of Councillors.

References 

Members of the House of Councillors (Japan)
Living people
Year of birth missing (living people)